Henri Baudrand (21 December 1902 – 13 August 1993) was a French weightlifter. He competed in the men's featherweight event at the 1928 Summer Olympics. He placed 7th overall.

References

1902 births
1993 deaths
French male weightlifters
Olympic weightlifters of France
Weightlifters at the 1928 Summer Olympics
Sportspeople from Lyon
20th-century French people